Beer (German: Bier) is a major part of German culture. German beer is brewed according to the Reinheitsgebot, which permits only water, hops, and malt as ingredients; and stipulates that beers not exclusively using barley-malt, such as wheat beer, must be top-fermented.

In 2020, Germany ranked third in Europe in terms of per-capita beer consumption, behind the Czech Republic and Austria.

Styles

Pale lagers
Export is a pale lager brewed around Dortmund, and is fuller, maltier, and less hoppy than Pilsner. 12–12.5° Plato, 5–5.5% ABV. Germany's most popular style in the 1950s and 1960s, it is now becoming increasingly rare.
Helles is a malty pale lager from Bavaria of 11–12° Plato, 4.5–5% ABV.
Kölsch is a pale, light-bodied, top-fermented beer, which when brewed in Germany, can only legally be brewed in the Cologne region. 11–12° Plato, 4.5–5% ABV.
Maibock is a pale, strong lager brewed in the spring. 16–17° Plato, 6.5–7% ABV.

Märzen is a medium-bodied, malty lager that comes in pale, amber, and dark varieties. 13–14° Plato, 5.2–6% ABV. This type of beer is traditionally served at the Munich Oktoberfest.
Pilsener is a pale lager with a light body and a more prominent hop character. 11–12° Plato, 4.5–5% ABV. By far the most popular style, it has around two-thirds of the market.
Spezial is a pale, full, bitter-sweet, and delicately hopped lager. 13–13.5° Plato, 5.5–5.7% ABV.

Dark lagers
Altbier is a top-fermented, lagered beer. It is brewed only in Düsseldorf and the Lower Rhine region. Its origins lie in Westphalia, and  a few Altbier breweries are still in this region. Tastes range from mildly bitter and hoppy to exceptionally bitter. About 10 breweries in the Düsseldorf region brew Altbier at 5–6.5% ABV.
Bock is a heavy-bodied, bitter-sweet lager that uses dark-coloured malts. 16–17° Plato, 6.5–7% ABV.
Doppelbock is a very strong, very full-bodied lager that uses dark-coloured malts. 18–28° Plato, 8–12% ABV.
Dunkel is a dark lager made in two main varieties, the sweetish, malty Munich style and the drier, hoppy Franconian style.
Schwarzbier is a bottom-fermented, black lager beer. 11–12° Plato, 4.5–5% ABV.

Kellerbiers are unfiltered lagers conditioned in a similar manner to cask ales. Strength and colour vary, though in the Franconia region where these cask-conditioned lagers are still popular, the strength tends to be 5% ABV or slightly higher, and the colour tends to be a deep amber, but the defining characteristic is the cask conditioning. Kellerbier is German for "cellar beer".

Zwickelbier was originally a sample amount of beer taken by a brewery boss from the barrel with the help of a special pipe called a Zwickelhahn. Zwickelbiers are unfiltered lagers like Kellerbiers, though with a slightly different conditioning process, which gives the lager more carbonation. Zwickelbiers tend to be younger, lower in alcohol, and less hoppy than Kellerbiers.

A very similar beer is Zoiglbier, which in the Upper Palatinate's brewing practice is advertised with a Zoiglstern (i.e., sign) — a six-pointed blue-and-white symbol made from wooden slats, similar to a Star of David.

Münchener Bier is a beer from Munich that is protected under EU law with PGI status, first published under relevant laws in 1998. This designation was one of six German beers registered with the PGI designation at the time.

Wheat beers

 Weizenbier and Weißbier are the standard German names for wheat beerWeizen is German for "wheat", and weiß is German for "white".
 Berliner Weisse is a pale, very sour, wheat beer brewed in Berlin. 9° Plato, 2.5–5% ABV. The beer is typically served with raspberry- or woodruff-flavoured syrup.
 Hefeweizen is an unfiltered wheat beer. Hefe is German for yeast.
 Kristallweizen is a filtered wheat beer, characterized by a clear appearance as opposed to the cloudy look of a typical Hefeweizen.
 Weizenbock is the name for a strong beer or bock made with wheat. 16–17° Plato, 6.5–8% ABV.
 Roggenbier is a fairly dark beer made with rye, somewhat grainy flavour similar to bread, 4.5–6% ABV.

Breweries

While the beer market is weaker but more centralized in northern Germany, southern Germany has many smaller, local breweries. Almost half of all German breweries are in Bavaria, where the seven main breweries produce  annually. In total, about 1,300 breweries in Germany produce over 5,000 brands of beer.

The highest density of breweries in the world is found in Aufseß near the city of Bamberg, in the Franconia region of Bavaria, with four breweries and only 1,352 citizens. The Benedictine abbey Weihenstephan brewery (established in 725) is reputedly the oldest existing brewery in the world (brewing since 1040).

In 2004, Oettinger replaced Krombacher as the best selling brand in Germany.

Alcohol content
The alcohol-by-volume, or ABV, content of beers in Germany is usually between 4.7% and 5.4% for most traditional brews. Bockbier or Doppelbock (double Bockbier) can have an alcohol content of up to 16%, making it stronger than many wines.

Drinkware

Weizen glass

A Weizen glass is used to serve wheat beer. Originating in Germany, the glass is narrow at the bottom and slightly wider at the top; the width both releasing aroma, and providing room for the often thick, fluffy heads produced by wheat beer. It tends to be taller than a pint glass, and generally holds 500 millilitres with room for foam or "head". In some countries, such as Belgium, the glass may be 250 ml or 330 ml.

Wheat beers tend to foam a lot, especially if poured incorrectly. A customary manner is to swirl around a bit of (preferably cold) water in the glass to wet it and afterwards pouring the beer slowly, holding the glass in an angle of approximately 45 °.

Beer stein
A beer stein (or simply a stein  ) is an English neologism for a traditional type of beer mug. Steins may be made of stoneware (rarely the inferior earthenware), pewter, porcelain, silver, glass, or wood. They may have open tops or may have hinged pewter lids with a thumb-lever.

Steins usually come in sizes of a half-litre or full litre (or comparable historical sizes). Like decorative tankards, they are often decorated in nostalgic themes, generally showing allusions to Germany or Bavaria.

It is believed by some that the lid was implemented during the time of the Black Plague to prevent diseased flies from getting into the beer.

Maß
The Maß (pronounced ) is a term used in German-speaking countries for a unit of volume, now typically used only for measuring beer sold for immediate on-site consumption. As a Maß is a unit of measure, various designs are possible: modern Maßkrugs (Maßkrüge in German) are often handled glass tankards, although they may also be in the form of steins. At the Octoberfest beer is available in Maßkrug or half-litre 'Halb'.

Stange and Becher
A Stange (stick or rod) is a cylindrical glass that is traditionally used for Kölsch beer. A Becher (tumbler), traditionally used for Altbier, is similar to a Stange but is slightly shorter and much thicker. Stangen are carried by placing them into holes in a special tray called a Kranz (wreath). In Cologne Stanges are usually served by traditional waiters called Köbes.

Pilstulpe

The Pilstulpe ("Pilsner Tulip") or Biertulpe ("Beer tulip") is the tradition glass for German pilsner beers. When used in restaurant settings, a small piece of absorbent paper is placed around the base to absorb any drips from spilling or condensation.

Beer boot

Beer boots (Bierstiefel in German) have over a century of history and culture behind them. It is commonly believed that a general somewhere promised his troops to drink beer from his boot if they were successful in battle. When the troops prevailed, the general had a glassmaker fashion a boot from glass to fulfill his promise without tasting his own feet and to avoid spoiling the beer in his leather boot. Since then, soldiers have enjoyed toasting to their victories with a beer boot. At gatherings in Germany, Austria, and Switzerland, beer boots are often passed among the guests for a festive drinking challenge. Since the movie Beerfest appeared in 2006, beer boots have become increasingly popular in the United States. Glass beer boots are either manufactured using a mold or from mouth-blown glass by skilled artisans.

In Germany, beer boots usually contain between 2 and 4 litres and are passed from one guest at the table to the next one clockwise. When almost reaching the bottom of the boot, it suddenly starts bubbling. By some accounts, drinker who caused the bubbling has to order the next boot. There are also boots known with 6 and 8 litres. That being said, beer boots are almost never seen in Germany, even among friends who do drink as much and more beer on an evening out together; normal glasses are preferred. They are, however, very commonly used in drinking games in fraternities.

Beer festivals

 Oktoberfest is a 16- to 18-day festival held annually in Munich, Bavaria, Germany, running from late September to the first weekend in October. Only beer which is brewed within the city limits of Munich with a minimum of 13.5% Stammwürze (approximately 6% alcohol by volume) is allowed to be served in this festival. Upon passing this criterion, a beer is designated Oktoberfest Beer. Large quantities of German beer are consumed, with almost 7 million liters served during the 16-day festival in 2007. In 2015 the festival officially served 7.3 million liters of beer.
Other festivals include
 The Cannstatter Volksfest in Stuttgart.
 The Gäubodenvolksfest in Straubing
 The Bergkirchweih in Erlangen
 The Hanover Schützenfest
 The Freimarkt in Bremen
 The Augsburger Plärrer in Augsburg
 The Nockherberg Starkbierfest in Munich
 The Volksfest in Pfaffenhofen
In many cases, the beer festival is part of a general funfair or volksfest.

See also

 Beer and breweries by region
 List of brewing companies in Germany
 Reinheitsgebot, German Beer Purity Order

References

Further reading
Prost!: The Story of German Beer, Horst D. Dornbusch, Brewers Publications (1997),  
Good Beer Guide Germany, Steve Thomas, CAMRA Books (17 May 2006),

External links

 EuropeanBeerGuide.net

 
German cuisine